Andrea Benatti (born 8 November 1979) is an Italian rugby union player who last played for Aironi in the Pro12 in Italy. Once considered a star prospect, Benatti sat out several games for the national team in reserve for Mauro Bergamasco. A strong tackler with good ball-carrying skills, he has won five caps for Italy.

Personal life
On 2 December 2017, the two Benatti's children, Kim (aged 2) and Leonardo Zeus (aged 5) were murdered by his wife Antonella Barbieri.

References

1979 births
Living people
Italy international rugby union players
Sportspeople from the Province of Mantua
Rugby union flankers